Huta Szumy  is a village in the administrative district of Gmina Susiec, within Tomaszów Lubelski County, Lublin Voivodeship, in eastern Poland. The village is located in the historical region Galicia.

References

Huta Szumy